Karim Emilio Roberto Gazzetta (1 April 1995 – 21 November 2022) was a Swiss professional footballer who played as a midfielder.

Club career
Gazzetta had played for Servette FC since he was young. In 2013, he received his first professional contract, also due to various poaching attempts by domestic and foreign clubs. He made his debut in the first team on 22 July 2013. For the second half of 2014, he played at Étoile Carouge FC in the Promotion League while on loan, then switched back to Servette. At the end of September 2016, he was transferred to FC Winterthur, where he was injured just a few days after the move and was only able to train with Winterthur again after the winter break.

In the 2019–20 season as well as in 2020–21, Gazzetta played for FC Stade Lausanne-Ouchy. In June 2021, he moved to Neuchâtel Xamax. For the 2022–23 season, Gazzetta joined the Bosnian football club HŠK Zrinjski Mostar who were the defending champions.

International career
Gazzetta played for the Switzerland junior national teams up to U20.

Death
On 21 November 2022, Gazzetta committed suicide, jumping from the eighth floor of a building in Mostar, Bosnia and Herzegovina. The local police department conducted a series of investigations at the site of his death.

Honours
Servette
1. Liga Promotion: 2015–16

References

External links
 
 

1995 births
2022 suicides
2022 deaths
Footballers from Geneva
Swiss men's footballers
Association football midfielders
Switzerland youth international footballers
Swiss Super League players
Swiss Challenge League players
Swiss Promotion League players
Premier League of Bosnia and Herzegovina players
Servette FC players
Étoile Carouge FC players
FC Winterthur players
FC Stade Lausanne Ouchy players
Neuchâtel Xamax FCS players
HŠK Zrinjski Mostar players
Suicides in Bosnia and Herzegovina 
Suicides by jumping
Swiss expatriate footballers
Swiss expatriate sportspeople in Bosnia and Herzegovina
Expatriate footballers in Bosnia and Herzegovina